Jhansi railway division is one of the three railway divisions under North Central Railway zone of Indian Railways. This railway division was formed on 5 November 1951 and its headquarters are located at Jhansi in the state of Uttar Pradesh of India.

Prayagraj railway division and Agra railway division are the other two railway divisions under NCR Zone headquartered at Prayagraj.

List of railway stations and towns 
The list includes the stations under the Jhansi railway division and their station category.

Stations closed for Passengers - Gola ka mandir, Scindia ki chhavani, Morar, Hazira, Gwalior Kampoo kothi, Jivaji ganj and many other Gwalior suburban railway stations which were belong to NG.

References

 
Divisions of Indian Railways
1951 establishments in Uttar Pradesh